Ciao is a 2008 gay independent film directed and co-written by Yen Tan and starring Adam Neal Smith, Alessandro Calza, Charles W. Blaum and Ethel Lung.

Synopsis
With the slogan "If you could go back... what would you say to the one you loved", Ciao (meaning both hello and goodbye in Italian) tells  the story of two men who form an unlikely bond when a mutual friend named Mark (played by Charles W. Blaum) dies unexpectedly in a car crash in Dallas

Mark's best friend Jeff (Adam Neal Smith) is left with the task of going through Mark's personal effects and informing relatives and friends of his death. While going through Mark's e-mails to let people know about his passing, Jeff discovers that Mark was corresponding with an Italian man named Andrea (Alessandro Calza), who had already planned a trip to fly to Dallas to visit Mark for the first time without knowing he had actually died.

Jeff invites Andrea to come to Texas anyway and stay with him for two days at his place. Ciao portrays these two days where the two bereaved friends one from Dallas and the other from Italy meet and talk mostly about Mark and the impact he had on both of them in a close, personal and frank manner. Through these intimate conversations, the two men form a rapport that grows, and they are soon drawn together both by their connection with the deceased Mark, and by a growing intimacy with each other. Andrea has to leave at the end of his two-day stay, but invites Jeff to Italy for a visit at some later date.

Cast
Adam Neal Smith as Jeff
Alessandro Calza as Andrea
Charles W. Blaum as Mark
Ethel Lung as Lauren
John S. Boles as Mark's Father
Margaret Lake as Mark's Mother
Tiffany Vollmer as Doctor

Production
Ciao was made on a very small budget and was co-written by Yen Tan and actor Alessandro Calza. The film was produced by Jim McMahon, co-produced and edited by David Patrick Lowery, and co-produced by James M. Johnston, who also served as the 1st assistant director.

Music
Main musical theme of the film is "Five Times a Minute" sung by Charles W. Blaum (who plays the role of the dead Mark) and Adam Neal Smith (who plays the role of Jeff). The song was written by Curtis Glenn Heath. It is shown when Andrea (played by Alessandro Calza) introduces a video he had received from Mark where he professes his love and regards for both Andrea and Jeff.

Reception
The film received mixed reviews. Ruthe Stein from the San Francisco Chronicle praised the acting, but like some other reviewers criticised the "snails pace" of the movie's story. AfterElton named Ciao "the best gay movie I've seen this year" and the Los Angeles Times called it "a revelation; a minimalist work of maximum effect".

Awards
The film won the Jury Prize / Best Feature Film at the Philadelphia International Gay & Lesbian Film Festival, the Queer Lion at Venice Film Festival, was given honorable mention at the Dallas International Film Festival, and was part of the Official Selection for Outline Framefest Newline.

References

External links
 Ciao Movie official website 

2008 films
American LGBT-related films
American romantic drama films
Films directed by Yen Tan
Films set in Texas
Films shot in Dallas
American independent films
Gay-related films
2008 romantic drama films
2000s English-language films
2000s American films